Silvanus recticollis, is a species of silvan flat bark beetle found in Afro-Oriental regions.

Distribution
It is found in many Oriental countries such as India, Sri Lanka, Vietnam, Laos, Sulawesi, Japan, Thailand, and Iriomote Islands. In African region, it is found in Ethiopia, Mauritania, Congo, Zaire, and Zimbabwe. In 2019, the species was recorded from Poland for the first time. It is also found in the Sardinia island of Italy, and from Florida, USA.

Description
It is a small, dull species with an average length of about 1.69 to 2.19 mm. The body is elongated, and moderately depressed. Dorsum is uniformly yellowish brown and covered with short, semi-erect, with golden pubescence. Head slightly broader than long. Vertex densely punctured with coarse punctures but clypeus is less densely punctured. Pronotum slightly longer than broad, appearing quadrate. Eyes small with long temple. Antenna moderately long and slender with large scape and short pedicel. Prothorax convex, slightly elongated and quadrate. Scutellum moderately large, transverse and pubescent.

References 

Silvanidae
Insects of Sri Lanka
Insects of India
Insects described in 1876